The Glen Gardner Pony Pratt Truss Bridge is a historic pony Pratt truss bridge on School Street (formerly Mill Street) crossing the Spruce Run in Glen Gardner of Hunterdon County, New Jersey. It was designed by Francis C. Lowthorp and built in 1870 by William Cowin of Lambertville, New Jersey. The bridge was added to the National Register of Historic Places on September 22, 1977 for its significance in engineering, industry and transportation. It is one of the few early examples of iron Pratt truss bridges remaining in the United States. It was later documented by the Historic American Engineering Record in 1991.

Description
The Glen Gardner bridge is one of three remaining composite cast iron and wrought iron Pratt truss bridges built by Cowin in New Jersey. The others are the New Hampton Pony Pratt Truss Bridge (1868) in New Hampton and the Main Street Bridge (1870) in Clinton. It features a pedestrian walkway with a decorative cast-iron railing.

Gallery

See also
 National Register of Historic Places listings in Hunterdon County, New Jersey
 List of bridges documented by the Historic American Engineering Record in New Jersey
 List of bridges on the National Register of Historic Places in New Jersey

References

External links
 
 
 

	
	
Glen Gardner, New Jersey
Pratt truss bridges in the United States
National Register of Historic Places in Hunterdon County, New Jersey
Road bridges on the National Register of Historic Places in New Jersey
Historic American Engineering Record in New Jersey
New Jersey Register of Historic Places
Bridges completed in 1870
1870 establishments in New Jersey
Iron bridges in the United States